TechSat-21 (Technology Satellite of the 21st Century) was a small spacecraft developed by the U.S. Air Force Research Laboratory's Space Vehicles Directorate to test technology for formation flight of spacecraft which can rapidly change formation based on mission requirements. The project was canceled in 2003 due to numerous cost overruns.

References 

Cancelled spacecraft
Technology demonstration satellites
Satellites of the United States Air Force